Ahmad Abdullah Juma Bin Byat (born July 1, 1962) is an Emirati firmly established in the UAE’s business environment, holding directorial positions in several prominent Dubai organisations.

He is currently the Founding Chairman and CEO of Zaina Investments LLC a private family office, Vice Chairman of Dubai Chamber of Digital Economy and lately was appointed as a Member of Higher committee for future technologies for Dubai.

Bin Byat previously held the roles of chairman of Emirates Integrated Telecommunications Company PJSC (du); member of the board of trustees for Mohammed bin Rashid School of Government; member of the board of trustees for Zayed University;  Member of the Board of Emirates Investment Authority; Director General of Dubai Creative Clusters Authority; Member of the Dubai Free Zone Council; Chief executive officer and then Vice Chairman and Managing Director of Dubai Holding; Member of the Board of Museum of the Future Establishment; Member of Dubai 10x Council; chairman of the Dubai Urban Planning Committee; director general of Dubai Technology and Media Free Zone Authority and secretary-general of the Dubai Executive Council.

Additionally, he also served as the Founding Chairman of Emirates Central Cooling Systems Corporation (EMPOWER); Founding Chairman of the Dubai Real Estate Corporation (Wasl); Founding Chairman of the Dubai Education Council; Founding Chairman of The Consulting Office; chairman of the founding committee at Aswaaq; Chairman of the Executive Committee of Smart Dubai; executive chairman of TECOM Investments; a member of the board of  Thuraya Telecommunications Company; member of the Dubai Supreme Fiscal Committee; member of the Supreme Committee for Telecom ; member of the Smart Government Supreme Committee; Deputy Regional Manager at Etisalat; chairman of Dubai Real Estate Corporation and the President of the Dubai Government Excellence Program.

Career (current)

Vice chairman and managing director, Zaina Investments LLC (2013–present)

Vice Chairman, Dubai Chamber of Digital Economy (2021–present)

Member of Higher committee for future technologies for Dubai (2022–present)

Career (former)

Founding Chairman and CEO, Dubai Holding 

In collaboration with the [Dubai Holding Executive Committee], Bin Byat provides strategic leadership to [Dubai Holding] and its entities, to maintain the company's growth and ensure the achievement of business objectives.

Member of the board of trustees, Dubai School of Government

Bin Byat's responsibilities as a member of the board of trustees include monitoring the overall functioning and operations of the DSG, to ensure it continues to be the leading public policy research and teaching institution in the region.

Director general, Dubai Creative Clusters Authority

As director general at Dubai Creative Clusters Authority (DCCA), Bin Byat oversees the establishment and registration of companies in the TECOM Business Parks, which includes Dubai Internet City, Dubai Outsource Zone, Dubai Media City, Dubai Studio City, International Media Production Zone, Dubai Health Care City, Dubai Knowledge Village, Dubai International Academic City, Environment and Energy Park (Enpark), DuBiotech, Dubai Industrial City.

Chairman, Emirates Integrated Telecommunications Company PJSC (du) (2006–2018)

Bin Byat has held the position of founding chairman of du;, the UAE's second integrated telecom services provider, since the company's inception in 2006, leading to its commercial launch in 2007. In his role with the telecom, he oversees the board of directors, steering strategic decision-making and liaising with government authorities.

Chairman of the board of directors, The Consulting Office (2008–2012)

As chairman of the board of directors at The Consulting Office, Bin Byat oversaw the board's decisions to the benefit of the UAE's public sector. The Consulting Office is an initiative of the Dubai Government to provide top-tier advisory services to public sector organizations in Dubai, other Emirates and the MENA region.

Executive chairman, TECOM Investments (2007–2012)

In his role as executive chairman of TECOM Investments, Bin Byat oversaw the development of the region's leading creator of knowledge-based industry clusters. To date, this encompasses 11 business parks spanning sectors such as ICT, media, education, biotechnology, healthcare, industrial and energy. TECOM's business ventures also include international investments and joint ventures.

Member of the board of trustees, Zayed University (2007–2011)

In his capacity as a board member, Bin Byat was tasked with ensuring that the university's mandate is being fulfilled by offering educational programmes of the highest quality.

Chairman, founding committee at Aswaaq (2008–2010)

Bin Byat served as the chairman on the founding committee at Aswaaq, the UAE-wide supermarket chain that claims to be a “responsible local retailer working towards a better neighbourhood.”

Chairman, Dubai Real Estate Corporation (2007–2010)

In this position, Bin Byat closely directed the consolidation of governmental real estate assets under a single umbrella. He also oversaw the creation of the Dubai Real Estate Corporation (DREC), which was tasked to own and manage all properties registered under the name of the Dubai Government. Additionally, he was responsible for ensuring that commercial and industrial lands and properties were adequately funded and efficiently utilized.

Member of the Supreme Fiscal Committee, Dubai (2007–2009)

As a member of the Supreme Fiscal Committee, Bin Byat was tasked with overseeing the development of sound fiscal practices, guidelines and set up for the public sector.

Secretary-general, Dubai Executive Council (2006–2009)

Bin Byat played a leading role in formulating the emirate's strategic plan, including the creation and implementation of the Dubai Strategic Plan 2015.

President, Dubai Government Excellence Programme (2006–2009)

During his time as the president of Dubai Government Excellence Programme, Bin Byat participated in practices to improve the performance of the government sector in Dubai, on a par with international standards and practices.

Chairman, Dubai Urban Planning Committee (2006–2008)

As part of the Dubai Urban Planning Committee, Bin Byat oversaw the development of Dubai's future urban development.

Member of the Supreme Committee for Telecom, UAE (2004–2008)

In this position, Bin Byat participated in the drafting of the UAE's telecommunications regulations and the creation of the Telecommunications Regulatory Authority.  Additionally, he was involved in the introduction of competition into the market.

Chairman, Dubai Education Council (2005–2006)

As chairman of the Dubai Education Council, Bin Byat oversaw the development of multitier educational strategy, focused on enhancing the education sector in Dubai for the medium and long term.

Member of the board, Thuraya Telecommunications Company (1997 - 1999)

As a founding board member with  Thuraya Telecommunications Company, Bin Byat supervised the creation, strategy development and business model of the company as the first handheld mobile satellite company in the MENA region, based in the UAE. He oversaw the planning and launch of the first medium orbit satellite, Thuraya 1, into space, then witnessed the first handheld-to-handheld voice call via the satellite.

Deputy regional manager, Emirates Telecommunications Corporation (Etisalat) (1984–1999) (Good)

During his time with Etisalat, Bin Byat saw the creation of the telco as a regional telecommunication giant. He participated in some of the company's – and UAE's – major milestones, such as the conversion of the telecommunication network in the UAE from analogue to digital, and the launch of Internet, mobile services and e-commerce in the UAE.

References

External links
Dubai Holding
Dubai Technology and Media Free Zone Authority
Emirates Integrated Telecommunications Company PJSC (du)
Aswaaq
Dubai School of Government
TECOM Investments
The Consulting Office
Zayed University
Dubai Education Council
Dubai Executive Council
Dubai Real Estate Corporation
Emirates Telecommunication Corporation (Etisalat)
Thuraya Telecommunications Company

1962 births
Living people